Harun Çabuk (born 1997) is a Turkish motorcycle racer. He competes for Kawasaki Puccetti Racing team on a Kawasaki Ninja 300.

Private life
Harun Çabuk was born into a motorcycle-related family in Denizli, western Turkey in 1997. His father Yaşar Çabuk is a motorcycle mechanic and her mother Gülay is a motorcycle racing referee.

At the age of 2–3 years, he used to spend his time at his father's motorcycle repair shop. At the age of 5–6 years, he started to ride small motorcycles.

Sports career
Çabuk began to race when he received his own motorcycle, and won many trophies and medals at local and nationwide events already at very young age. He won four Turkish champion titles in motorcycle racing and motocross. Following his success, five-time world-champion retired Turkish motorcycle racer Kenan Sofuoğlu took him in his team.

Çabuk debuted internationally in 2012 at the first round of the Supermoto Junior and S3 European Championships at Pleven, Bulgaria, and became champion. He completed the 2015 European Junior Cup at tenth place. He placed third at the 2016 European Junior Cup finishing three of the season's total eight rounds as winner. The 2017 Supersport 300 World Championship ended for him at 22nd rank.

Career statistics

European Junior Cup

Supersport 300 World Championship

References

External links
54 Harun Cabuk at SBK Motul Worşd Championship

Living people
1997 births
Sportspeople from Denizli
Turkish sportsmen
Turkish motorcycle racers
Supersport 300 World Championship riders